Eucereon coenobita is a moth of the subfamily Arctiinae. It was described by Heinrich Benno Möschler in 1886. It is found on Jamaica.

References

coenobita
Moths described in 1886